Helios Airways Flight 522 was a scheduled passenger flight from Larnaca, Cyprus, to Prague, Czech Republic, with a stopover in Athens, Greece. Shortly after take-off on 14 August 2005, air traffic control (ATC) lost contact with the aircraft operating the flight, named Olympia; it eventually crashed near Grammatiko, Greece, killing all 121 passengers and crew on board. It is the deadliest aviation accident in Greek history.

An investigation into the crash by the Air Accident Investigation and Aviation Safety Board (AAIASB) concluded that the crew had neglected to set the pressurization system to automatic during the take-off checks.  This caused the plane not to be pressurized during the flight and resulted in nearly everyone on board suffering from hypoxic hypoxia, thus resulting in a ghost flight. The negligent nature of the accident led to lawsuits being filed against Helios Airways and Boeing, with the former also being shut down by the government of Cyprus the following year.

Background
The aircraft involved in this accident, initially registered as D-ADBQ, was a Boeing 737-300, first flown on 29 December 1997, and was operated by DBA from 1998 until 2004. It was then leased by Helios Airways on 16 April 2004, and was re-registered 5B-DBY with the nickname Olympia. Besides the downed aircraft, the Helios fleet also included two leased Boeing 737-800s and an Airbus A319-100, which were delivered on 14 May 2005.

The plane had arrived at Larnaca International Airport at 01:25 local time on the day of the accident. It was scheduled to leave Larnaca at 09:00 and fly to Prague Ruzyně International Airport, with a stop off at Athens International Airport, where it was due to arrive at 10:45. The captain of the flight was Hans-Jürgen Merten, a 58-year-old German contract pilot hired by Helios for holiday flights, who had been flying for 35 years (previously for Interflug from 1970 to 1991), and had accrued a total of 16,900 flight hours (including 5,500 hours on the Boeing 737). The first officer was Pampos Charalambous, a 51-year-old Cypriot pilot who had flown exclusively for Helios for the past five years, accruing 7,549 flight hours throughout his career (3,991 of them on the Boeing 737). Louisa Vouteri, a 32-year-old Greek national living in Cyprus, had replaced a sick colleague as the chief flight attendant.

Flight and crash 

When the aircraft arrived at Larnaca from London earlier that morning, the previous flight crew had reported a frozen door seal, and abnormal noises coming from the right aft service door. They requested a full inspection of the door. The inspection was carried out by a ground engineer, who then performed a pressurization leak check. In order to carry out this check without requiring the aircraft's engines, the pressurization system was set to "manual". However, the engineer failed to reset it to "auto" on completion of the test.

After the aircraft was returned into service, the flight crew overlooked the pressurization system state on three occasions: during the pre-flight procedure, the after-start check, and the after take-off check. During these checks, no one on the flight deck noticed the incorrect setting. The aircraft took off at 09:07 with the pressurization system still set to "manual", and the aft outflow valve partially open.

As the aircraft climbed, the pressure inside the cabin gradually decreased. The warning should have prompted the crew to stop climbing, but it was misidentified by the crew as a take-off configuration warning, which signals that the aircraft is not ready for take-off, and can only sound on the ground. The alert sound is identical for both warnings.

In the next few minutes, several warning lights on the overhead panel in the cockpit illuminated. One or both of the equipment cooling warning lights came on to indicate low airflow through the cooling fans (a result of the decreased air density), accompanied by the master caution light.

Shortly after the cabin altitude warning sounded, the captain radioed the Helios operations centre and reported "the take-off configuration warning on" and "cooling equipment normal and alternate off line." He then spoke to the ground engineer, and repeatedly stated that the "cooling ventilation fan lights were off." The engineer (the one who had conducted the pressurization leak check) asked: "Can you confirm that the pressurization panel is set to AUTO?" However, the captain, already experiencing the onset of hypoxia's initial symptoms, disregarded the question, and instead asked in reply, "Where are my equipment cooling circuit breakers?" This was the last communication with the aircraft.

Between 09:30 and 09:40, Nicosia ATC repeatedly attempted to contact the aircraft, without success. At 09:37, the aircraft passed from Cyprus flight information region (FIR) into Athens FIR, without making contact with Athens ATC. Nineteen attempts to contact the aircraft between 10:12 and 10:50 also met with no response, and at 10:40, the aircraft entered the holding pattern for Athens Airport, at the KEA VOR, still at FL340. It remained in the holding pattern, under control of the auto-pilot, for the next 70 minutes.

At this point, whether by request from air traffic control or of their own accord, the Greek military decided to intervene. At 11:05, two F-16 fighter aircraft from the Hellenic Air Force 111th Combat Wing were scrambled from Nea Anchialos Air Base to establish visual contact. They intercepted the passenger jet at 11:24, and observed that the first officer was slumped motionless at the controls, and the captain's seat was empty. They also reported that oxygen masks were dangling in the passenger cabin.

At 11:49, flight attendant Andreas Prodromou entered the cockpit and sat down in the captain's seat, having remained conscious by using a portable oxygen supply. His girlfriend and fellow flight attendant, Haris Charalambous, was also seen in the cockpit helping Prodromou try to control the aircraft. Prodromou held a UK Commercial Pilot Licence, but was not qualified to fly the Boeing 737. Prodromou waved at the F-16s very briefly, but almost as soon as he entered the cockpit, the left engine flamed out due to fuel exhaustion, and the plane left the holding pattern and started to descend. Crash investigators concluded that Prodromou's experience was insufficient for him to be able to gain control of the aircraft under the circumstances. However, Prodromou succeeded in banking the plane away from Athens and towards a rural area as the engines flamed out. There were no ground casualties.  Ten minutes after the loss of power from the left engine, the right engine also flamed out, and just before 12:04, the aircraft crashed into hills near Grammatiko,  from Athens, killing all 121 passengers and crew on board.

Passengers
The aircraft was carrying 115 passengers and a crew of six. The passengers included 67 due to disembark at Athens, with the remainder continuing to Prague. The bodies of 118 people were recovered. The passenger list included 93 adults and 22 children. The passengers comprised 103 Cypriot nationals and 12 Greek nationals.

Investigation

Overview
The flight data recorder and cockpit voice recorder were sent to the Bureau of Enquiry and Analysis for Civil Aviation Safety in Paris. The CVR recording enabled investigators to identify Prodromou as the flight attendant who entered the cockpit in order to try to save the plane. He called "mayday" five times, but because the radio was still tuned to Larnaca and not Athens, he was not heard by ATC. His voice was recognized by colleagues who listened to the CVR recording.

Many of the bodies recovered were burned beyond recognition by the post-impact fire. Autopsies on the crash victims showed that all were alive at the time of impact, but it could not be determined whether they were conscious as well.

The emergency oxygen supply in the passenger cabin of this model of Boeing 737 is provided by chemical generators that provide enough oxygen, through breathing masks, to sustain consciousness for about 12 minutes, normally sufficient for an emergency descent to 10,000 feet (3,000 m), where atmospheric pressure is sufficient for humans to sustain consciousness without supplemental oxygen. Cabin crew have access to portable oxygen sets with considerably longer duration.

The Hellenic Air Accident Investigation and Aviation Safety Board (AAIASB) listed the direct causal chain of events that led to the accident as:

 non-recognition by the pilots that the pressurization system was set to "manual",
 non-identification by the crew of the true nature of the problem,
 incapacitation of the crew due to hypoxia,
 eventual fuel starvation,
 impact with the ground.

Previous pressurization problems
On 16 December 2004, during an earlier flight from Warsaw, the same aircraft experienced a rapid loss of cabin pressure and the crew made an emergency descent. The cabin crew reported to the captain that there had been a bang from the aft service door, and that there was a hand-sized hole in the door's seal. The Air Accident and Incident Investigation Board (AAIIB) of Cyprus could not conclusively determine the causes of the incident, but indicated two possibilities: an electrical malfunction causing the opening of the outflow valve, or the inadvertent opening of the aft service door.

The mother of the first officer killed in this crash claimed that her son had repeatedly complained to the captain about the aircraft getting cold. Passengers also reported problems with air conditioning on Helios flights. During the 10 weeks before the crash, the aircraft's environmental control system was repaired or inspected seven times.

A 2003 flight of a Boeing 737 between Marseille Airport and Gatwick Airport showed that a cabin-wide pressurization fault could be recognized by the flight crew. A problem was first noticed when the crew began to feel some discomfort in their ears. This was shortly followed by the cabin altitude warning horn, which indicated that the cabin altitude had exceeded , and this was seen to continue to climb on the cockpit gauge. At the same time, the primary AUTO mode of the pressure control failed, followed shortly by the secondary STBY mode. The crew selected the first manual pressure control mode, but were unable to control the cabin altitude. An emergency descent and subsequent diversion to Lyon was carried out. The failure of the pressurization control system was traced to burnt electrical wiring in the area aft of the aft cargo hold. The wiring loom had been damaged by abrasion with either a p-clip or "zip" strap that, over time, exposed the conductors, leading to short circuits and subsequent burning of the wires. There was no other damage. The wiring for all the modes of operation of the rear outflow valve, in addition to other services, run through this loom.

Subsequent developments

On 29 August 2005, the company announced successful safety checks on their Boeing fleet, and put them back into service. It later changed its name from Helios Airways to αjet. However, when authorities in Cyprus detained the company's aircraft and froze the company's bank accounts about a year later, the airline announced that it would stop operating on 31 October 2006.

In the aftermath of the incident, a number of fake photographs purported to depict the aircraft involved in Helios Flight 522 circulated, and were claimed to be the final photographs of the aircraft before it crashed, taken during its intercept by the Hellenic Air Force. These images, depicting a Boeing 737 of Helios Airways accompanied by F-16s were found to be fabricated; the aircraft depicted in the image is 5B-DBH Zela, a Boeing 737-800 that was in service with Helios at the time of the incident identified by its overwing exits, longer fuselage, and trailing edge wingtips.

In March 2011, the Federal Aviation Administration in the United States released an Airworthiness Directive requiring all Boeing 737 aircraft from −100 to −500 models to be fitted with two additional cockpit warning lights. These would indicate problems with take-off configuration or pressurization. Aircraft on the United States civil register were required to have the additional lights by 14 March 2014.

Lawsuits and criminal proceedings
Families of the dead filed a lawsuit against Boeing on 24 July 2007. Their lawyer, Constantinos Droungas, said, "Boeing put the same alarm in place for two different types of dysfunction. One was a minor fault, but the other—the loss of oxygen in the cockpit—is extremely important." He also said that similar problems had been encountered before on Boeings in Ireland and Norway. The families sued for 76 million euros in compensation from Boeing. The case against Boeing was settled out of court.

In early 2008, an Athens prosecutor charged six former employees with manslaughter over the incident. Reports at the time said the suspects were three Cypriots, two Britons and one Bulgarian.

On 23 December 2008, Helios Airways and four of its officials were charged in Cyprus with 119 counts of manslaughter, and of causing death by recklessness and negligence. The four officials were: former chief pilot Ianko Stoimenov, chairman of the board Andreas Drakos, chief executive officer Demetris Pantazis, and operations manager Giorgos Kikidis. The trial began in November 2009; the state prosecutors finished presenting their case in June 2011. On 21 December 2011, the case was dismissed, and the defendants were acquitted. The panel of judges hearing the case ruled that there was no “causal association between the defendants, and the negligence they were charged with for the fatal accident.” An appeal was filed by the Cypriot Attorney-general, and in December 2012, the Supreme Court set aside the acquittal and ordered a new trial. Two months later, the retrial was dropped under double jeopardy rules, as the charges had already been heard in Athens.

In December 2011, shortly after the end of the case in Cyprus, a new trial began in a Greek magistrate's court, in which chief executive officer Demetris Pantazis, flight operations manager Giorgos Kikkides, former chief pilot Ianko Stoimenov, and chief engineer Alan Irwin were charged with manslaughter. All except Irwin had been previously charged and acquitted by the Cypriot authorities. In April 2012, all were found guilty, and sentenced to 10 years imprisonment, and remained free on bail pending an appeal.

By 2013, Alan Irwin was successful in his appeal. All the other defendants lost their appeals. Their sentence of 10 years was ordered to stand, but the defendants were given the option to buy out their sentence for around €79,000 each. Stoimenov was spared time in jail after the intervention of the Bulgarian government, who felt that he was innocent of the charges.

Greek investigators blamed the crash of the Helios Airways flight outside Athens on human error, after the aircraft failed to pressurize after taking off from Larnaca Airport. Prosecutors in both countries blamed airline officials for cutting corners on safety operations, while also arguing that they failed to act on advice that the pilots did not meet the necessary aviation standards.

Relatives of the dead filed a class action suit against the Cypriot government—specifically the Department of Civil Aviation—for negligence that led to the air disaster. They claimed that the DCA had ignored airlines' loose enforcement of regulations, and that in general, the department cut corners when it came to flight safety.

In popular culture
The Discovery Channel Canada/National Geographic TV series Mayday featured the accident in a Season 4 episode titled "Ghost Plane".

The 2020 novel Lost Love Song by Minnie Darke adapted the accident as a plot device. In the novel it is a fictional Australian airline that crashes in the ocean, but almost all other circumstances are the same.

See also
 1999 South Dakota Learjet crash
 2000 Australia Beechcraft King Air crash
 2022 Baltic Sea Cessna crash

References

Cited text:
 Air Accident Investigation and Aviation Safety Board (AAIASB)
 Final report: Aircraft Accident Report: Helios Airways Flight HCY522 at Grammatiko, Greece on 14 August 2005 (Archive), published November 2006
 Alternate location of final report (Archive)
 Greek version of the final report (Archive)

Further reading

External links

 
 

2005 disasters in Greece
Accidents and incidents involving the Boeing 737 Classic
Airliner accidents and incidents caused by fuel exhaustion
Airliner accidents and incidents caused by pilot error
Airliner accidents and incidents caused by pilot incapacitation
Airliner accidents and incidents involving in-flight depressurization
Aviation accidents and incidents in 2005
Aviation accidents and incidents in Greece
2005 in Cyprus
2005 in Greece
August 2005 events in Europe
Cyprus–Greece relations